Pottasch is a surname. Notable people with the surname include:

 Alan Pottasch (1927–2007), American advertising executive 
 Stuart Pottasch (1932–2018), American astronomer

See also
 10431 Pottasch; see Meanings of minor planet names: 10001–11000#431
 Potash